Pons de Capduelh (fl. 1160–1220 or 1190–1237) was a troubadour from the Auvergne, probably from Chapteuil. His songs were known for their great gaiety. He was a popular poet and 27 of his songs are preserved, some in as many as 15 manuscripts. Four of his cansos survive with musical notation.

Biography

Vida and razo
There survives a vida, or short biography, of Pons written by a contemporary and fellow troubadour, Uc de Saint Circ. According to Uc, Pons and  troubadour Guillem de Saint Leidier were both from the diocese of Le Puy, and while Guillem was "generous with money" (larcs donaire d'aver), Pons was very stingy (fort escars d'aver). He reportedly loved Azalais, daughter of Bernard VII of Anduze and wife of Oisil de Mercoeur (or Mercuor). (Bernard of Anduze was a patron of many troubadours.) The vida states that "[Pons] loved [Azalais] dearly and praised her and made many good songs about her; and as long as he lived, he loved no other, and when the lady died, he took the cross and went over the sea and died there." According to the razo that follows the vida in some manuscripts, Pons, to test Azalais's love for him, began loving another woman, Audiart, wife of Roselin, lord of Marseille. The rift between them was only healed by the intervention of Maria de Ventadorn and the viscountess of Aubusson. After Azalais's death in 1237, Pons wrote a planh (lament) for her, "De totz caitius sui eu aicel que plus". Some scholars argue that this planh was in fact written for Alazais de Boissazo, who died before 1220, and others have erroneously equated Azalais with the lady known only as Sail-de-Claustra in the poems of Peirol.

Pons was exiled from his homeland in the middle of the 1210s and travelled "through Provence" (per Proensa) in order to join the Fifth Crusade around 1220. According to the untrustworthy Jean de Nostredame, he died after participating in the conquest of Jerusalem, in 1227. Older scholars, such as Friedrich Christian Diez and Max von Napolski, believed that Pons died on the Third Crusade in 1189, but this is conclusively disproven.

Documentary evidence
The parents of Pons are unknown, but he was of the family of the lords of Fay and had six children identifiable in the records. Pons is probably to be identified with the "Pontius de Capitolio" who appears in documents between 1189 and 1220. Before 1196, Pontius married a woman named Jarentone who brought him the castle of Vertaizon, a fief of the bishop of Clermont, as a dowry. In 1199, Pons imprisoned Bishop Robert of Clermont. In 1205, responding to an inquiry begun by Pope Innocent III, King Philip II forced Jarentone to hand over Vertaizon to the bishop. In 1211, Pons and Jarentone, with their three sons, three daughters and three sons-in-law, sold Vertaizon to the bishop for 7,650 marks, of which 7,000 were to be retained by the bishop as compensation for his unlawful imprisonment. Pons's sons were Jourdain, Pierre de Fay and Jarenton.

Pons was probably acquainted with the trobairitz Clara d'Anduza and the troubadours Dalfi d'Alvernha, Folquet de Marselha (whom he praised in a song), and Peirol. Gui de Cavaillon and Ricau de Tarascon invoke Pons and Audiart as judges of their tenso, composed after 1210, and Elias de Barjols also mentions Pons.

Of all Pons's works, with the possible exception of the planh, only his two crusade songs can be dated with confidence to around 1213. "So qu'om plus vol e plus es voluntos" was written after the battle of Las Navas de Tolosa (16 July 1212) and before the battle of Muret (12 September 1213), since it was dedicated to Peter II of Aragon, who died there. The crusade song "En honor del pair'en cui es", which has the form of a sirventes, refers to war of the Holy Roman Emperor (probably Otto IV) and the King of England against Philip II and the "King of Apulia" (probably Frederick II). This is probably the War of Bouvines.

Pons's songs "" and "" are speculatively dated to around 1210.

List of surviving works
Cansos
 
 
 
 
 
 
 
 
 
 
  (with music)
 
 
 
 
 
 
 
 
 
 
  (with music)

Crusade songs
  
 
 

Descorts
 

Planhs

Footnotes
Notes

Citations

Sources

Aubrey, Elizabeth. The Music of the Troubadours. Indiana University Press, 1996. 
Chambers, Frank M. Review of "Le troubadour Pons, seigneur de Chapteuil et de Vertaizon: son temps, sa vie, son oeuvre" by Jean Perrel. Romance Philology 32, 1 (1978): 140.
Lucas, H. H. "Pons de Capduoill and Azalais de Mercuor: A Study of the Planh". Nottingham Mediaeval Studies 2 (1958): 119–13.
Poe, Elizabeth Wilson. "Old Provençal Escars/Escas: "Poor"? Reconsidering the Reputation of Pons de Capdoill". Tenso 4, 2 (1989): 37–58.

Further reading

Fabre, Claude. Le Troubadour Pons de Chapteuil, quelques remarques sur sa vie et sur l'esprit de ses poèmes. Le Puy-en-Velay: Peyriller, Rouchon et Gamon, 1908.
Napolski, Max von. Leben und Werke des Trobadors Pons de Capduoill. Halle: Niemeyer, 1879.
Perrel, Jean. "Le troubadour Pons, seigneur de Chapteuil et de Vertaizon, son temps, sa vie, son oeuvre". Revue d'Auvergne 90, 2–3 (1976): 89–199.
Thomas, Antoine. "L'identité du troubadour Pons de Chapteuil". Annales du Midi 5 (1893): 374–79.

12th-century French troubadours
Christians of the Fifth Crusade
Year of birth unknown
13th-century deaths
13th-century French troubadours